Blood of the Saints is the fourth studio album by German power metal band Powerwolf, released in 2011. It is the band's first album with songs that had music videos, made for "We Drink Your Blood" and "Sanctified with Dynamite". In addition to recording at Studio Fredman, Sweden, the band recorded some parts of the album in the 12th-century Deutschherrenkapelle chapel in Saarbrücken.

A limited edition of Blood of the Saints included a bonus CD titled The Sacrilege Symphony (And Still the Orchestra Plays), which contained orchestral versions of Powerwolf songs. It was arranged by Dominic G. Joutsen, who previously worked for the metal band Heavenwood.

Critical reception 
The record reached position number 23 in the German charts and 75 in the Swiss charts.

Metal.de wrote about the album: "This is a very melodic power metal sounding from the speakers, which impresses above all through catchiness and a powerful sing along factor. At least after the second run everyone will be able to sing along at least the choruses. Of course this is again due to the powerful yet clear voice of Attila Dorn, who has now finally given up his accent. He sings even more aggressively. The Metal Hammer judged: "Certainly: Powerwolf let their musical influences always open through, and if you listen well, the trained ear recognizes very quickly riff quotes from bands like Iron Maiden, Judas Priest or Accept. But how can you blame the wolves for creating excellent songwriting?"

The album won the Metal Hammer "Power metal album of the year" award.

Track listing

Personnel 

Powerwolf
Attila Dorn – vocals
Matthew Greywolf – lead and rhythm guitar
Charles Greywolf – bass, rhythm guitar
Falk Maria Schlegel – organ, keyboards

Additional musicians
Roel van Helden – drums, percussion
Marcel Sude – spoken words
Gerhard Dilk – vocals (choir; bass)
Bardo Stahl – vocals (choir; bass)
Till Gros – vocals (choir; bass)
Peter Kargerer	– vocals (choir; bass)
Thorsten Peeß – vocals (choir; bass)
Ulrich Hinterberg – vocals (choir; tenor)
Marin Traue – vocals (choir; tenor)
Sebastian Koch – vocals (choir; tenor)
Florian Keller – vocals (choir; tenor)
Marco Korz – vocals (choir; tenor)
Heinz Seger – vocals (choir; tenor)
Christian Kuhn – vocals (choir; tenor)
Jens Fried – vocals (choir; tenor)
Rouven Bitz – vocals (choir; tenor)
Dirk Reichel – vocals (choir; tenor)
Frank Beck – vocals (choir; tenor)
Christoph Höbel – vocals (choir; tenor)
Ute Gapp – vocals (choir; alto)
Britta Bethscheider – vocals (choir; alto)
Bianca Bethscheider – vocals (choir; alto)
Julia Sharon Harz – vocals (choir; alto)
Charlotte Hess  – vocals (choir; alto)
Helen Vogt – vocals (choir; soprano)
Karin Trautwein – vocals (choir; soprano)
Christine Kruchten – vocals (choir; soprano)
Anne Diemer – vocals (choir; soprano)
Angela Streit – vocals (choir; soprano)
Eva Gehring – vocals (choir; soprano)
Maria Speicher – vocals (choir; soprano)
Bianca-Patricia Wegner – vocals (choir; soprano)
Emily Schmitz – vocals (choir; soprano)

Technical personnel
Kristian Kohlmannslehner – engineer, recording, editing
Fredrik Nordström – mixer
Henrik Udd – mixer
Peter In de Betou – mastering
Kai Stahlenberg – recording, editing
David Buballa – engineer, editing
Francesco Cottone – choir conductor
Charles Greywolf – bass engineer
 Rouven Bitz – choir conductor

Other personnel
Manuela Meyer – photography
Matthew Greywolf – artwork, layout

Charts

References 

2011 albums
Powerwolf albums